Tomanak-e Sofla (also Romanized as Tomanak-e Soflá) is a village in Pataveh Rural District, Pataveh District, Dana County, Kohgiluyeh and Boyer-Ahmad Province, Iran. At the 2006 census, its population was 39, in 7 families.

References 

Populated places in Dana County